Hapdong Theological Seminary(합동신학대학원대학교, 合同神學大學院大學校) is the Presbyterian seminary in South Korea. The history of Hapdong Theological Seminary began with its founding on November 11, 1980. Hapdong Theological Seminary upholds 3 pillars of school motto which are founded upon the Reformed faith. The school motto begins with a Korean word, "Barun," which means "upright," "correct," or (morally) "right" : "Upright Theology (God-honoring Theology), Upright Church (Christ-centered Church), Upright Life (Spirit-filled Life)." Hapdong Theological Seminary takes the training of its students for the ministry and leaders of the church very seriously who, with the Word of God, transforming the world.

See also
Park Yun-sun 
 Deok-Kyo Oh
 Seung-Goo Lee

Notes

External links
 Website

Educational institutions established in 1980
Hapdong Theological Seminary
Seminaries and theological colleges in South Korea
Schools in Suwon
Presbyterian universities and colleges